Grace Matthews (September 3, 1910 – May 15, 1995) was a Canadian actress in the era of old-time radio and the early years of television. She is perhaps best known for portraying Margo Lane in the radio program The Shadow.

Early years
Matthews was born in Toronto, Canada, on September 3, 1910. She graduated from the University of Toronto and from the Royal Academy of Dramatic Art in London, England.

Radio
Matthews played Margo Lane in The Shadow 1946-1949. Lane was described in the program's scripts as the faithful companion of Lamont Cranston, alter ego of The Shadow. A February 5, 1987, article in the Milwaukee Journal reported Matthews' confusion about the programs: "The plots were so complicated I often had difficulty figuring them out. After the show, I'd go home and ask my husband ... to explain what had happened."

Matthews was the lead actress on American Portrait, Soldier's Wife and The Story of Dr. Susan, and she appeared often on Armstrong's Theatre of Today. She was active in Canadian radio for about five years before she began working on radio in the United States. In later years, she was heard in some episodes of CBS Radio Mystery Theater.

Stage
Matthews' theatrical work included stock theater in Manitoba, Canada, and Ontario, Canada, summer stock activities in Marblehead, Massachusetts, and the production of Dame Nature by the Theatre Guild in New York City.

In Canada, Matthews was active in the Hart House Theatre and the John Holden Players.

Television
Matthews was seen in Road of Life, As the World Turns as Grace Baker #2, and The Guiding Light as Claudia Dillman. She also spent three years in London, England, acting in programs on ITV and the BBC.

Recognition
Matthews' work as an actress on radio in Canada in 1944 earned her three national awards — The Major Genera La Fleche Trophy, Canadian Broadcaster magazine's Beaver Award and a top rating in a poll by Canadian newspapers. She also won the Beaver Award (for "Distinguished Service to Canadian Radio") in 1940.

Personal life
Matthews married announcer and actor Court Benson in October 1940. They had a daughter, Andrea, and a son, Paul.

Death
Matthews died May 15, 1995, in Mount Kisco, New York.

References

1910 births
1995 deaths
American radio actresses
Canadian stage actresses
20th-century American actresses
20th-century Canadian actresses
University of Toronto alumni
Alumni of RADA
Canadian emigrants to the United States